Enes Kuka (born 14 January 2002) is an Albanian professional footballer who plays as a midfielder for Tirana.

Career statistics

Club

Notes

Honours
Tirana
 Kategoria Superiore: 2021–22

References

2002 births
Living people
Albanian footballers
Association football midfielders
KF Tirana players
Kategoria Superiore players